Communist movements in India refers to the various social and political movements lead by communists in India. Communism in India has existed since the 1920s. Some of the major events are listed below.

Indian independence movement

Peasant movements
Communists were actively involved in various movements from 1920s. All India Kisan Sabha (AIKS) was founded in 1936, which predominantly became active in India. By 1942, AIKS and communists dominated the peasant movement in the country. The members of AIKS or Kisan Sabha were mostly communists. This created a political and social base for communists among the peasant section of India. Sahajanand Saraswati, Karyanand Sharma, Bhogendra Jha were most notable leaders of the movements. Afterwards Bakasht movement (1946-1952), Madhubani movement, Darbhanga movement

Telangana armed struggle (1946-51)

During the 1920s and the early 1930s the Communist Party existed but was badly organised, and in practice there were several communist groups working with limited national coordination. The British colonial authorities had banned all communist activity, which made the task of building a united party very difficult. A Communist Group was founded in Tashkent on 17 October 1920, soon after the Second Congress of the Communist International by M.N. Roy. Roy made contacts with Anushilan and Jugantar groups in Bengal. Small communist groups were formed in Bombay (led by S.A. Dange), Madras (led by Singaravelu Chettiar), United Provinces (led by Shaukat Usmani), Punjab, Sindh (led by Ghulam Hussain) and Bengal (led by Muzaffar Ahmed).

Tebhaga Movement (1946-1950)

During 1946, sharecroppers had contracted to give half of their harvest to the landlords. Soon sharecroppers began to assert that they would pay only one-third and that before division the crop would stay in their godowns and not that of the Jotedars. In September 1946 Bangiya Pradeshik Kisan Sabha decided to launch the Tebhaga movement. The peasant movement lead by Communist Party of India broke out in Kakdwip, Sonarpur, Bhangar and Canning. In many areas the agitations turned violent, and landlords fled, leaving parts of the countryside in the hands of Kisan Sabha. The movement resulted in clashes between Jotedars and Bargadars (sharecroppers). "Tebhaga" meantime one third portion of the whole. The prominent leaders of the movement were: Kansari Halder, Ganesh Das, Ashok Bose and Rash Behari Ghosh. Peasant leaders like Gajen Malik, Manik Hazra, Jatin Maity, Bijoy Mondal and others rose to prominence. The movement continued till 1950, when the Bargadari Act was enacted.

Farmer's movements in Rajasthan
Communists or more precisely Communist Party of India (Marxist) has done multiple subsequent peasant and farmer's movements in Rajasthan. In 2000, the Kisan Sabha led by communists laid siege to the Rajasthan Legislative Assembly and demanded an increase in the number of hours they were supplied with power each day. In 2004, the CPI(M) again started a movement in Shri Gangangar district bordering the Shekhawati region, against the reduction in their water allowance from the Indira Gandhi Canal. This resulted death of four farmers as Rajasthan Police opened fire on the agitating farmers. The government had to agree to increase the water allowance. In 2005, CPI(M) again agitated against to a hike in electricity tariffs, by conducting sit-in in state capital, Jaipur which subsequently resulted decreasing the tariffs.

A large farmer's movement started in Rajasthan on 1 September 2017 to promote farmer's loan waivers, minimum support price and other demands under the leadership of Akhil Bhartiya Kishan Sabha (AIKS). Kisan Sabha, President, Amra Ram, Former MLA Pema Ram, Hetram Benwal, Pawan Duggal, Mangal Singh Yadav, Bhagirath Netar, Sagar Mal Khachariya and others were leading the movement. Sikar was the center of movement, so it is known as "Sikar Kisan Andolan". Thousands of farmers gathered in Sikar Mandhi on 1 September, and said their Padav would continue until demands were accepted. Kishan Padav (Hindi: किसान पड़ाव) continued in Sikar and Other Districts including Bikaner, Nagaur, Jhunjhunu, Churu, Hanumangarh, Shri Ganganagar, Alwar till 10 September. During this, government imposed Section 144 and also blocked Internet services in Sikar. When the demands were not accepted, on 10 September, AIKS called a Statewide Indefinite Highway Strike.  After beginning from Sikar, this movement spread throughout Rajasthan, it had a widespread impact in 14 districts. Meanwhile, Sikar and other cities were also kept under strike. Traders and many organizations supported the Farmer's Movement. On 11th day, on the call of the Kisan Sabha, the farmers blocked highways and all other major and minor roads. Then the government invited the delegation of farmers for the talks on 11 September. After 2 days long talk government buckled on 13 September night and accepted the demand of farmers. The movement was withdrawn after the demands were accepted.

Left movements in Manipur (1940-1951)
At the jail, Irabot met Indian communist leaders like Hemanga Biswas and Jyotirmoy Nandi. He was greatly influenced by them.

Irabot was finally permitted to enter Manipur in March 1946. In Manipur he organised a new party called the Manipur Praja Mandal in April 1946. He attended two sessions of the Nikhil Manipuri Mahasabha before he was expelled from the membership of the Working Committee of the Mahasabha on the charge of being a member of the Communist Party of India. He attended the second congress of the CPI held at Calcutta from 28 Feb to 6 March 1948.

Irabot could not attend the first meeting of the Manipur Legislative Assembly held on 18 October 1948 because of the warrant against him. Irabot formed an underground Communist Party of Manipur on 29 October 1948 and carried out armed struggle against the government. He died on 26 September 1951 at the foothills of the Anggo Hills.

Participation in Goa Liberation movement (1954-1961)
During Satyagraha Movement in Goa, Communist Party of India decided to send batches of satyahrahis since the middle of 1955 to the borders of Goa and even inside. Countrywide lists of satyagrahis were prepared, who were then sent to Goa borders in a series of memorable satyagrahas, which has few parallels in the annuls of the history. Batches after batches defied the Portuguese police and military, entered the borders of Goa, raised Indian Tricolour, and were fired upon and lathi-charged brutally. Many were killed, many more others arrested and sent to jails inside Goa and inhumanly treated. Many others were even sent to jails in Portugal and were brutally tortured.

References

Communism in India